Edward Rowsby Woof (18 January 1883 – 31 December 1943) was an English violinist and music educator. He was born in Coalbrookdale, son of Edward Woof and his wife Sarah (née Rowsby). He became professor of violin at the Royal Academy of Music (FRAM) in London, and wrote instructional works on violin technique and violin studies. Among his pupils were Arthur Kennedy, Nona Liddell, William Waterhouse, Frederick Grinke, Jean Pougnet, Priaulx Rainier, Rosemary Rapaport, Sidney Griller, Peter Mountain, Colin Sauer and Felix Kok.

Career
From information in prospectuses of the Royal Academy of Music.
 Violin sub-professor: 1904-1905
Woof was awarded the Royal Academy of Music's Bronze Medal for Violin in 1904, the Silver Medal for Violin in 1905, and the Dove Prize in 1906. In 1907, he made his debut at Bechstein Hall (now Wigmore Hall).

 Violin professor: 1909-1939
 Viola professor: 1912-1939
 Ensemble playing classes: 1914-1923

Family
Rowsby Woof married Victoria Mary Fox, a music teacher, in 1911. He died at St. Andrew's Hospital in Dollis Hill, London in 1943.

Legacy

The Rowsby Woof Prize for Royal Academy of Music violin students, founded by his wife in 1944, was awarded annually in the years 1945 to 1963.  The Prize Board listing the awardees was added to the RAM Museum's collection in 2011.  Recipients include Colin Sauer (1945), Clarence Myerscough (1952), Brendan O' Reilly (1956) and John Georgiadis (1959) of the Gabrieli String Quartet, and Roy Malan (1963), founding concertmaster of the San Francisco Ballet Orchestra.

Rowsby Woof is listed in the Musicians' Book of Remembrance in the Musician's Chapel at St Sepulchre-without-Newgate.

Selected works
Compositions
 Diamond Jubilee, children's song, words by S. R. W., R.Cocks & Co.: London [1897]
 Reverie, for violin & piano, C. Woodhouse: London, 1909
 Little Waltz in first position, for violin & piano, C. Woodhouse: London, 1910
 Scherzo, for violin & piano, C. Woodhouse: London, 1910
 Scherzo, for piano, Cary & Co.: London, 1912
 Swinging, for violin & piano, Cary & Co.: London, 1913
 Forsaken, for violin & piano. Cary & Co.: London, 1914
 The North Wind, for violin & piano, J. Williams: London, 1919
 A Romp, for violin & piano, J. Williams: London, 1919
 Four Fancies, for violin & piano. I Caprice II Romance III Minuet IV In church, Anglo-French Music Co.: London, 1920
 Valse Capriccio, for violin & piano, J. Williams: London, 1927
Arrangements
 Bach, J. S.: Largo and Allegro, arr. violin & piano
 Paganini, N. Caprice, arr. violin & piano [1922] 
 Geminiani, F.: Sonata Op.4 No. 10, Two Minuets [1927]
Instructional works
 The First Position Six short pieces for beginners for violin. Anglo-French Music Co.: London, 1910
 Technique and Interpretation in Violin-playing [1920] 
 Thirty Studies of Moderate Difficulty for Violin 
 Fifty Elementary Studies for Violin 
 Official book of Scales and Arpeggios for the Violin ed. R. Woof, Associated Board of the Royal Schools of Music: London, 1922

References

External links
 
 

1883 births
1943 deaths
20th-century classical violinists
20th-century English musicians
Alumni of the Royal Academy of Music
British male violinists
English classical violinists
20th-century British male musicians
Male classical violinists